The Beeshoek mine is a large iron mine located near Postmasburg in the Northern Cape province of South Africa. Beeshoek represents one of the largest iron ore reserves in South Africa and in the world, having estimated reserves of 117.5 million tonnes of ore grading 63.7% iron metal.

References 

Iron mines in South Africa
Economy of the Northern Cape
Geography of the Northern Cape